Ivan Alexeyevich Stretovich (born 6 October 1996) is a Russian artistic gymnast. He won a silver medal in the team event at the 2016 Summer Olympics.

Competitive history

Career 
Stretovich started gymnastics at six years old when his mother took him to a gym club. He won gold at his first competition. He trains in Moscow, with the other members of the Russian team, and in Novosibirsk. His gymnastics idol is Hiroyuki Tomita.

Junior 
Stretovich appeared in his first major international competition at the 2012 European Junior Championships where the Russian Team won the silver medal, he was the youngest member of the Team (15 years old).

In 2013, Stretovich won the all-around gold at the Russian Junior Championships (in the CMS section). He competed at the 2013 European Youth Olympic Festival where he took bronze medals in all-around, rings and gold in Parallel bars. Traveling to Brasilia, Brazil for the 2013 Gymnasiade, Stretovich won gold in parallel bars and with Team Russia winning the gold medal ahead of Great Britain.

Senior 
In 2014, Stretovich sustained an injury at the start of the season. He competed in his first Worlds at the 2014 World Artistic Gymnastics Championships in Nanning, China. Stretovich competed only in pommel horse in Team event and together with teammates (Denis Ablyazin, Nikita Ignatyev, Nikolai Kuksenkov, Daniil Kazachkov and David Belyavskiy) Team Russia finished 5th.

In 2015, Stretovich was again member of the Russian men competing at the 2015 World Championships in Glasgow, together with teammates (Denis Ablyazin, Nikita Ignatyev, Nikolai Kuksenkov, Nikita Nagornyy and David Belyavskiy)

In 2016, Stretovich competed at the Russian Cup in July; where he won gold in parallel bars and high bar. Stretovich was initially named as an alternate for the Olympic Team but only days before the games started he was chosen to replace Nikita Ignatyev on the team, allegedly due to him looking better in training at the time. Stretovich then competed with the Russian Team (together with Denis Ablyazin, Nikita Nagornyy, Nikolai Kuksenkov and David Belyavskiy) at the 2016 Summer Olympics in Rio de Janeiro, he contributed scores of 14.755 in pommel horse, 15.100 in parallel bars, 14.766 in horizontal bar; helping the Russian men's team win the silver medal with a total of 271.453 points.

In 2017, Stretovich suffered an arm injury and underwent treatment in Munich, Germany. On August 23–27, Stretovich returned to a national competition at the Russian Cup.

In 2019, Stretovich competed at the European Championships in April; where he placed sixth on the high bar. In July he competed the Summer Universiade in Napoli winning silver in the all-around and on parallel bars as well as bronze on horizontal bar and in the team competition. In September he competed at the Russian Cup where he won silver in the all-around competition behind Nikita Nagornyy and ahead of reigning All-Around World Champion Artur Dalaloyan. He was selected to compete at the World Championships for the first time since 2015 and placed 10th in the all-around in qualifying but did not progress to the finals because Nagornyy and Dalaloyan finished above him. In the team final Stretovich competed on Floor, Pommel Horse, Vault and High Bar to help Russia win team gold with a total of 261.726 points. Stretovich's score of 14.666 on High Bar during the team final was the highest of any gymnast in the final.

Competing alongside Angelina Melnikova, Stretovich helped team Russia finished Second at the Brabant Trophy in October. In December at the Toyota International in Tokyo, Stretovich won Bronze on High Bar.

See also
List of Olympic male artistic gymnasts for Russia

References

External links
 
 Ivan Stretovich at sportgymrus.ru 
 
 
 

1996 births
Living people
Russian male artistic gymnasts
Sportspeople from Novosibirsk
Gymnasts at the 2016 Summer Olympics
Olympic silver medalists for Russia
Medalists at the 2016 Summer Olympics
Olympic gymnasts of Russia
Olympic medalists in gymnastics
Universiade medalists in gymnastics
Universiade silver medalists for Russia
Universiade bronze medalists for Russia
Medalists at the 2019 Summer Universiade
21st-century Russian people